Here is a complete list for notable people who lived or from Kerman:

 A 
Ahmadreza Ahmadi, poet
Mahnaz Afkhami, former Minister of Women's Affairs of Iran (1975) & Founder and President of Women's Learning Partnership (WLP)
Ali Akbar Abdolrashidi, writer, journalist and television host.

 B 
Arash Borhani, Soccer player

 K 
Khwaju Kermani, poet from the 14th century.
Roohollah Khaleghi, Iranian musician, composer, conductor and author.

 N 
Zahra Nemati, Paralympic archery gold medallist At the 2012 Summer Paralympics.
Dr. Javad Nurbakhsh, Master of the Nimatullahi Sufi Order.

 M 
Houshang Moradi Kermani, author.
Ahmad Madani, Iranian politician, Commander of Iranian Navy (1979)
Mirza Aqa Khan Kermani, constitutionalist, an Iranian literary critic and founder of new Iranian nationalism.

See also 

 Kirmani, toponymic surname

Kerman